Here Comes the Cavalry is a 1941 American short Western film directed by D. Ross Lederman and starring Richard Travis, Ralph Byrd, Garry Owen, and Casey Johnson.

References

External links
 

1941 films
American short films
Films directed by D. Ross Lederman
1941 Western (genre) films
American Western (genre) films
1940s American films